The City District Government Karachi (CDGK) was a local government of Karachi, Pakistan. It was established through a local government ordinance (LGO) in 2000, which also established various other district governments in Pakistan. It was headed by the mayor and was formed under the presidential rule of Pervez Musharraf in 2001. CDGK existed until 2010.

CDGK became a major authority in the city and was granted unprecedented power. Urban authority was emphasized and rural authority was disbanded. The CDGK was a three-tier system, with each tier having its respective nazims and naib nazims (mayors and deputy mayors), and it oversaw a major increase in development.

In 2012, the Sindh government decided that the development projects first undertaken by the CDGK would be carried out by the Karachi Metropolitan Corporation (KMC).

Background 
On October 12, 1999, Pervez Musharraf imposed martial law and set up the National Reconstruction Bureau (NRB) which was tasked with designing a new local government system in Pakistan. The LGO was enacted in 2000, and in 2001, Karachi Metropolitan Corporation (KMC) was accorded the status of City District Government Karachi. According to SLGO in 2001:

For the first time in the history of Pakistan, a district government decentralized authority to the local level.

Administration 
CDGK consisted of a three-tiered setup. Tier 1 was the City council of KMC; Tier 2 was the 18 Tehsil Municipal Administrations (TMA); and Tier 3 was the 178 union councils (UCs). The previous five-district setup was merged into the single district of Karachi. The KMC under CDGK had 255 members elected through popular elections of the UCs. The heads of these UCs then elected their mayor and deputy mayor.

Authority
The mayor controlled a large number of municipal powers and portfolios and his responsibilities included, but were not limited to:

The Mayor held one-third of the land control of Karachi. The rest was under the control of other bodies including the Government of Sindh—the federal government that had strong institutional presence independent of the district government—the CAA, railways, Cantonments), steel mills and the Karachi port trust, which each had their own regulations despite being required to coordinate with CDGK.

Initiatives

Traffic Wardens 
Due to a lack of traffic police and the need to manage the traffic of the city, the mayors introduced 1,575 traffic wardens. The system was dissolved when the 2001 LGO was scrapped by Sindh government.

Urban Transport System (UTS) / CNG Green Bus 
The first city government under Naimatullah Khan allowed the private sector to purchase imported, wide-bodied Compressed natural gas (CNG) buses. The purchase was given a subsidy of 6%, a federal government waiver on import duty and sales tax, and a 70% loan markup financed by the banks.

According to the plan, the city needed 8,000 buses to replace aging, pollutant vehicles and improve Karachi's public transport infrastructure. Initially, 300-350 buses were purchased, but 40% of the vehicles ended up in other locations.

A pilot project was initiated during the tenure of Mustafa Kamal. High operating costs (caused by the high diesel price and unavailability of compressed natural gas), insufficient revenue, lack of funding by the city government after two years, failure to maintain the buses, and inability to secure a loan contributed to the failure of the project. Only 12 buses from this project remain operable, mainly on Shahrah-e-Faisal.

There have been calls for the revival of CDGK.

Departments 
Various departments were transferred to the KMC to streamline the local body system.: 

  Karachi Water and Sewerage Board (KW&SB)
  Karachi Development Authority (KDA)
 Malir Development Authority (MDA)
 Lyari Development Authority (LDA)
 Master Plan
 Karachi Mass transit Cell (KMTC)
 Karachi Solid Waste Management (KSWM)
 Traffic Engineering Bureau (part of KDA)
 Karachi Urban Transport Corporation (KUTC) (A federal body with CDGK's 15% stake)
 Karachi Building Control Authority (KBCA)
 Land Registry Department
 Land Revenue Department

See also 
 Mayor of Karachi

References 

Karachi
Government of Karachi
Karachi-related lists
Politics of Karachi
Districts of Karachi